Proutia betulina is a species of moth of the family Psychidae described by Philipp Christoph Zeller in 1839.

References

Psychidae
Moths described in 1839
Taxa named by Philipp Christoph Zeller